Asinius is the nomen of the plebeian Gens Asinia of ancient Rome. Local tradition holds that the Italian town of Assignano derives its name from the gens, as well as the French town of Assignan.
 Gaius Asinius Pollio, orator, poet, historian, consul 40 BC
 Gaius Asinius Gallus Saloninus, consul 8 BC, died 30, father of Asinius Celer
 Gaius Asinius Pollio, consul 23
 Marcus Asinius Agrippa, consul 25
 Marcus Asinius Marcellus, consul 54
 Marcus Asinius Pollio Verrucosus, consul 81
 Marcus Asinius Atratinus, consul 89
 Gaius Asinius Frugi, monet. of Phrygia between 98 and 116
 Marcus Asinius Marcellus, the Younger, consul 104, son of Marcus Asinius Marcellus
 Gaius Asinius Rufus, notable in Lydia 134/135, senator 136
 Gaius Asinius Protimus Quadratus, proconsul of Achaea ca. 211 or 220 – son of the above
 Gaius Asinius Quadratus, historian of 3rd century – who may be identical with Gaius Asinius Quadratus Protimus
 Gaius Asinius Lepidus Praetextatus, consul of AD 242.